Division 3 is the fifth level in the league system of Swedish football and comprises 144 Swedish football teams. Division 3 had status as the official third level from 1928 to 1986, but was replaced by Division 2 in 1987. It then had status as the official fourth level until 2005, but was replaced once again as Division 1 was recreated in 2006.

The competition 
There are 144 clubs in Division 3, divided in 12 groups of 12 teams each representing a geographical area. During the course of a season (starting in April and ending in October) each club plays the others twice, once at their home stadium and once at that of their opponents, for a total of 22 games. The top team in each Division 3 group is promoted to Division 2 and the two lowest placed teams from each Division 2 league are relegated in their place. The second placed teams in each Division 3 group plays promotion/relegation play-offs against the third lowest teams in Division 2.

Normally, at the end of each season the three lowest placed teams of each group are relegated to the regional Division 4 and thirty-six teams from the regional Division 4 leagues are promoted in their place while the fourth lowest placed teams in the Division 3 leagues plays promotion/relegation play-offs against teams in Division 4. There were a series of relegation/promotion play-offs at the end of the 2010 season.

Administration

The Swedish Football Association ( SvFF) is responsible for the administration of Division 3.

Current clubs
2014 season

Division 3 Norra Norrland
Alviks IK
Assi IF
Bergnäsets AIK
Gällivare Malmbergets FF
Hedens IF
Infjärdens SK
Kiruna FF
Notvikens IK
Övertorneå SK
Robertsfors IK
Storfors AIK
IFK Umeå

Source:

Division 3 Mellersta Norrland
Brunflo FK
Friska Viljor FC
Frånö SK
Frösö IF
Gottne IF
Junsele IF
Röbäcks IF
Salsåker-Ullångers IF
Spöland Vännäs IF
IFK Timrå
Umedalens IF

Source:

Division 3 Södra Norrland
Avesta AIK
Brynäs IF
Falu FK
Forssa BK
Hille IF
Hofors AIF
Korsnäs IF
Kubikenborgs IF
Rengsjö SK
Strands IF
Sund IF
Valbo FF

Source:

Division 3 Västra Svealand
FK Bosna 92
IK Franke
IFK Kumla
Juventus IF
Köping FF
Kungsör BK
Ludvika FK
Munktorps BK
Örebro Syrianska IF
Sala FF
IK Sturehov
Villastadens IF

Source:

Division 3 Norra Svealand

BKV Norrtälje
FC Arlanda
FC Järfälla
Gideonsbergs IF
IFK Uppsala
IK Franke
Sala FF
Syrianska IF Kerburan
Spånga IS FK
Sundbybergs IK
Uppsala-Kurd FK
Valletuna BK

Source:

Division 3 Södra Svealand

Assyriska IF i Norrköping
IFK Eskilstuna
Eskilstuna Södra FF
IFK Haninge/Brandbergen
Järla IF
Järna SK
Lindö FF
Segeltorps IF
IFK Stockholm
Srbija FF
Tyresö FF
IK Viljan

Source:

Division 3 Nordöstra Götaland
Aneby SK
BK Derby
Gransholms IF
Gullringens GoIF
Hjulsbro IK
IFK Lammhult
AFK Linköping
Mjölby Södra IF
Moheda IF
Myresjö/Vetlanda FK
Söderköpings IK
Värnamo Södra FF

Source:

Division 3 Nordvästra Götaland
Ahlafors IF
IK Arvika
Gunnilse IS
Kortedala IF
Kungshamns IF
Kärra KIF
Lunden Överås BK
Säffle FF
Skoftebyns IF
Stångenäs AIS
Vänersborgs FK
Vänersborgs IF

Source:

Division 3 Mellersta Götaland
Alingsås IF
Assyriska Turabdin FK
IFK Falköping
Fristads GoIF
Götene IF
IF Haga
Skara FC
IFK Skövde
IFK Tidaholm
IK Tord
Ulricehamns IFK
Vårgårda IK

Source:

Division 3 Sydöstra Götaland
FK Älmeboda/Linneryd
Älmhults IF
Bergkvara AIF
IFK Hässleholm
IFÖ Bromölla IF
Nybro IF
IFK Osby
Räppe GoIF
Ronneby BK
Sölvesborgs GoIF
Tollarps IF
Växjö BK

Source:

Division 3 Sydvästra Götaland
Dalen/Krokslätts FF
Fässbergs IF
Hestrafors IF
Kållereds SK
Kinna IF
Laholms FK
BK Skottfint
Snöstorp Nyhem FF
Stafsinge IF
Ullareds IK
Västra Frölunda IF
Vinbergs IF

Source:

Division 3 Södra Götaland
Borstahusens BK
Ekets GoIF
Hittarps IK 
Husie IF 
Hyllie IK 
IF Lödde 
IFK Malmö 
BK Olympic
Österlen FF
Råå IF
Staffanstorps GIF
IFK Trelleborg

Source:

Seasons 

 1928–29
 1929–30
 1930–31
 1931–32
 1932–33
 1933–34
 1934–35
 1935–36
 1936–37
 1937–38
 1938–39
 1939–40
 1940–41
 1941–42
 1942–43
 1943–44
 1944–45
 1945–46
 1946–47
 1947–48
 1948–49
 1949–50
 1950–51
 1951–52
 1952–53
 1953–54
 1954–55
 1955–56
 1956–57
 1957–58
 1959
 1960
 1961
 1962
 1963
 1964
 1965
 1966
 1967
 1968
 1969
 1970
 1971
 1972
 1973
 1974
 1975
 1976
 1977
 1978
 1979
 1980
 1981
 1982
 1983
 1984
 1985
 1986
 1987
 1988
 1989
 1990
 1991
 1992
 1993
 1994
 1995
 1996
 1997
 1998
 1999
 2000
 2001
 2002
 2003
 2004
 2005
 2006
 2007
 2008
 2009
 2010
 2011
 2012
 2013
 2014
 2015
 2016
 2017
 2018
 2019
 2020
 2021

References 

5
 
Swe
Professional sports leagues in Sweden